Nancy Sullivan (born 1985) is a British actress and singer.

Early life and training 
Nancy was born in Bermondsey where she grew up with her family, her Dad was a boxer and furniture dealer, Mum later worked in a library, she is eldest of three children. She trained at the BRIT School and then continued her training at the London School of Musical Theatre. She graduated in 2004 and began to audition and start her career.

Career 
Her first job was working for Andrew Lloyd Webber at his Sydmonton Festival (2005), playing the role of Jenny in the world premier of The Likes Of Us. This was the first show Tim Rice and Andrew Lloyd Webber wrote together, the cast included Stephen Fry, Sally Anne Triplett, Hannah Waddingham and Michael Simkins. Sullivan can be heard on the cast recording of The Likes Of Us and appeared on BBC Radio 2's Friday Night Is Music Night performing the role in concert. She then workshopped a new Tony Award winning musical, Urinetown, in which she played the role of Little Becky (2005). Other roles Sullivan played included Nicola in Hitting Town (2005),  Cinderella in Cinderella (2005), Lisa in Footballer's Wives (2006), Lucy in Love Me Dorothy at the Edinburgh Festival Fringe (2006), understudy Dorothy in the RSC version of The Wizard Of Oz for the West Yorkshire Playhouse (2006).

She went on to create the role of Chloe for the new Take That musical, Never Forget, which completed a UK tour in 2007. Her performance can be seen on the Never Forget DVD, filmed by Universal Pictures and heard on the cast recording. In 2008, Sullivan applied for the BBC's I'd Do Anything to play the role of Nancy in Oliver!, Sullivan was taken through to the final stages and down the last 20 girls before leaving the competition. Having been noticed on the programme, Sullivan appeared as her dream role of Eponine in Les Misérables in the West End, playing the role for two years (2008-2010).

In 2013, Sullivan worked on the play Beautiful Thing at the Arts Theatre, where she was understudy to the roles of Leah and Sandra, played by the actresses Suranne Jones and Zaraah Abrahams. She later performed both roles. She then went to play the Niece in The Good Person of Szechwan at The Colchester Mercury Theatre, and then to play Sherbet in the 21st Anniversary Production of The Fastest Clock in the Universe at the Old Red Lion. This production received five star reviews and was filmed by the V&A for their National Video Archives of Performance.

More recent activities 

Sullivan has gone on to work on independent British films, new writing and other stage works. Her roles include; Joanne in What If Like Me (British Film 2011), Shy in The Best Little Whorehouse in Texas (Union Theatre 2011), various roles in Who's Stalking John Barrowman? (New Workshop piece 2012), Liza in Liza Liza Liza (New Workshop piece 2012), Les Misérables directed by Tom Hooper, in which she played one of the Lovely Ladies (2012), Anthea in Judy The Righteous (Trafalgar Studios and Kings Head Theatre 2012), Sandy in Smile Baby Smile (British Film 2012); plus understudy to Sandra and Leah in the play Beautiful Thing (The Arts Theatre, West Yorkshire Playhouse and Liverpool Everyman 2013).

She runs a workshop company with David Thaxton, W1 Workshops, aimed at people wishing to further their development in the performing arts world.

References

External links
 Official Nancy Sullivan Website
 W1 Workshops

1986 births
Living people
Actresses from London
English singers
English musical theatre actresses
People from Bermondsey
English actresses